The Westinghouse AN/ASQ-153\AN/AVQ-23 Pave Spike is an electro-optical laser designator targeting pod used to direct laser-guided bombs to target in daylight, visual conditions. It contained a laser boresighted to a television camera, which displayed its image on a cockpit screen.

156 examples of the original AN/ASQ-153 were used by USAF F-4 Phantom II aircraft (D and E variants) from 1974 through 1989, replacing the earlier Pave Knife.  The 144-inch-long (3.66 m), 420-lb (209 kg) pod was mounted in the F-4's left forward missile well, in place of an AIM-7 Sparrow air-to-air missile.

In 1979, the Royal Air Force acquired a number of the simplified AN/AVQ-23E pods for their Blackburn Buccaneers. Twelve aircraft equipped with the pod were deployed to Saudi Arabia for the Gulf War to initially perform laser designation for other RAF aircraft  Later in the air campaign, these aircraft would carry laser-designated bombs themselves.

The pod is now obsolete, and is being phased out in favor of newer systems like LANTIRN and AN/ASQ-228 ATFLIR.

References

External links

Targeting pods
Equipment of the United States Air Force
Military electronics of the United States
Military equipment introduced in the 1970s